Ōpaki is small rural settlement in the Masterton District and Wellington Region of New Zealand's North Island.

Opaki railway station is located at Ōpaki. The centre of the village was bypassed in 1938, when a bridge replaced the railway level crossing, on what is now SH2.

Demographics 

Ōpaki had a population of 1,140 at the 2018 New Zealand census, an increase of 126 people (12.4%) since the 2013 census, and an increase of 288 people (33.8%) since the 2006 census. There were 435 households. There were 555 males and 582 females, giving a sex ratio of 0.95 males per female. The median age was 49.4 years (compared with 37.4 years nationally), with 201 people (17.6%) aged under 15 years, 132 (11.6%) aged 15 to 29, 567 (49.7%) aged 30 to 64, and 240 (21.1%) aged 65 or older.

Ethnicities were 95.8% European/Pākehā, 8.2% Māori, 0.8% Pacific peoples, 1.1% Asian, and 1.6% other ethnicities (totals add to more than 100% since people could identify with multiple ethnicities).

The proportion of people born overseas was 16.8%, compared with 27.1% nationally.

Although some people objected to giving their religion, 48.7% had no religion, 41.8% were Christian and 1.1% had other religions.

Of those at least 15 years old, 243 (25.9%) people had a bachelor or higher degree, and 150 (16.0%) people had no formal qualifications. The median income was $42,000, compared with $31,800 nationally. The employment status of those at least 15 was that 492 (52.4%) people were employed full-time, 174 (18.5%) were part-time, and 12 (1.3%) were unemployed.

Education

School buses serve the neighbouring settlements of Rangitumau, Mauriceville and Mikimiki.

References

Masterton District
Populated places in the Wellington Region